"Feelin' Single" is the second single by American R&B/soul singer-songwriter-producer R. Kelly from his eleventh studio album Write Me Back. The song peaked at number one on the Billboard Adult R&B Songs chart, number 13 on the Bubbling Under Hot 100 Singles chart, and number 15 on the Billboard Hot R&B/Hip-Hop Songs chart. The song was written and produced by Kelly himself and Bigg Makk.

Charts

Weekly charts

Year-end charts

References

2012 singles
R. Kelly songs
Songs written by R. Kelly
Song recordings produced by R. Kelly
2012 songs
RCA Records singles